Cognitive Emancipation is the third studio album by Behold... The Arctopus, released in 2016. This is the first album to feature current drummer Jason Bauers after the departure of previous drummer Weasel Walter.

Track listing

Personnel
 Colin Marston – Warr Guitar, recording, mastering, mixing
 Mike Lerner – electric guitar, guitar solos
 Jason Bauers – drums

External links 
 Cognitive Emancipation on Bandcamp

2016 albums
Behold... The Arctopus albums
Albums produced by Colin Marston